The Battle of Farmington, Tennessee was fought October 7, 1863 in Farmington, Marshall County, Tennessee as part of Confederate Major General Joseph Wheeler's October 1863 Raid in the American Civil War. The battle was fought as Wheeler was retreating back to the Confederate lines. Following a Union cavalry charge, the Confederates were routed, with an entire regiment deserting.

Sources
 McDonough, James Lee. Chattanooga: A Death Grip on the Confederacy. Knoxville, Tennessee: The University of Tennessee Press, 1984. .

External links
 The Battle of Farmington

Farmingto, Tennessee
Farmington, Tennessee, Battle of
Farmington, Tennessee, Battle of
Farmington
Marshall County, Tennessee
October 1863 events